The Belmont Public Library is a public library in Belmont, Massachusetts. It is a member of the Minuteman Library Network. It is located on Concord Avenue near Belmont Center.

Buildings

The library has been housed in three buildings.

Originally, it was housed in the Belmont Town Hall, designed by architects Hartwell and Richardson and completed in 1881.

In 1902, a new facility was donated by Henry Oliver Underwood and opened in 1902. The building is on Pleasant Street and now serves as the School Administration Building.

In 1965, the Belmont Memorial Library on Concord Avenue was opened.

Administration
The current library director is Peter Struzziero.

References

External links
 http://www.belmont.lib.ma.us/

Public libraries in Massachusetts
Libraries in Middlesex County, Massachusetts
Belmont, Massachusetts